"Lonely and Gone" is a song recorded by American country music duo Montgomery Gentry. It was released in June 1999 as the second single from their debut album Tattoos & Scars. It peaked at number 5, thus becoming their first top 5 hit.  The song was co-written by Bill McCorvey of Pirates of the Mississippi, Dave Gibson and Greg Crowe.

Music video
The music video features the duo going through a house on the corner of "Lonely and Gone", and throughout the video, a lightning bolt struck  the house. By the end of the video, the house is an inferno. The music video was directed by Chris Rogers. It premiered on CMT on June 16, 1999.

Chart positions

Year-end charts

References

1999 singles
1999 songs
Montgomery Gentry songs
Columbia Nashville Records singles
Songs written by Dave Gibson (American songwriter)